Allaysky is a rural locality (a settlement) in Buzansky Selsoviet, Krasnoyarsky District, Astrakhan Oblast, Russia. The population was 196 as of 2010.

Geography 
Allaysky is located 45 km northwest of Krasny Yar (the district's administrative centre) by road. Delta is the nearest rural locality.

References 

Rural localities in Krasnoyarsky District, Astrakhan Oblast